Hope was a small ship launched in 1802. She wrecked at Port Stephens, New South Wales, Australia in 1817.

Hope was registered on 18 October 1802. At that time her owner (and builder) Andrew Thompson generally employed her on the Hawkesbury. On 28 February 1804 she was described as operating in the Bass Strait. Thompson died on 22 October 1810.

Loss
At the time of Hopes loss in 1817 her owner was Solomon Wiseman.

The crew of two, Benjamin Waterhouse (previously mate of ), and James Cohen dropped anchor and rowed ashore to prospect for cedar. They did not return to their ship, and the presumption was that aborigines had murdered them. The ship was subsequently blown ashore and wrecked.

Citations

References
 

Shipwrecks of the Hunter Region
Ships built in Australia
Port Stephens Council
Sail ships of Australia
Individual sailing vessels
Maritime incidents in 1817
1817 in Australia
1788–1850 ships of Australia
Merchant ships of Australia
1802 ships
Ships built in New South Wales